Ronald Turner (3 August 1922 – 19 December 1998) was a British illustrator and comic book artist.

Early life and career
Turner was born in Norwich, England. He became interested in science fiction at an early age, with numerous works across several media: the novels of H. G. Wells, Edgar Rice Burroughs, and Jules Verne; films and film serials such as Metropolis, Things to Come, and Flash Gordon; and Alex Raymond's comic strips. He developed a keen interest in American science-fiction pulp magazines, such as Amazing Stories and Astounding Stories (now known as Analog Science Fiction), and first started to develop his talent by attempting to copy the often spectacular cover illustrations.

In 1936, at the age of 14, Turner first got work as an apprentice in Odhams, a London art studio and publishing house. By 1938, Turner was providing illustrations for the British magazine Modern Wonder. In 1940, Turner's professional art career was interrupted by the Second World War, and he was drafted into the British Army. He returned to professional illustration in the late 1940s, finding a job drawing comic strips for Scion's Big series, which were mostly centred around the crew of the Atomic Mole: a subterranean craft, that explored the theoretical "habitable spaces" beneath the Earth's crust.

Odhams eventually began publishing a line of paperback fiction, for which Turner drew numerous covers, notably the Vargo Statten series by John Russell Fearn. Turner's art raised his profile to the extent that other publishers started to send him assignments. In 1953, Turner left Odhams to try his hand at freelancing and attempt to produce a regular comic strip in the style of British cartoonist Frank Hampson, whose work he admired.

Solo comics work
In 1953, Turner spoke to the publisher of Tit-Bits Science Fiction Novels (for which he was providing cover illustration) about the possibility of producing his own comic series. The publisher agreed, and began Tit-Bits Science Fiction Comics, a 64-page monthly comic book written, drawn and lettered by Turner. It quickly became apparent that the workload was too onerous for one man, and Turner brought in other artists in order to meet his deadlines. Publication was discontinued after seven issues.

Around the time of the demise of Tit-Bits Comics, Turner began to write, draw and letter the "Space Ace" strip for the Lone Star comic, which required only four pages per month. In 1954, he also started drawing for Amalgamated Press's Super-Detective Library comic, which had recently started running a science-fiction strip titled "Rick Random: Space Detective". Editor Ted Holmes commissioned Turner to provide art for the strip, leaving the chores of script-writing, lettering and cover illustration to others. Turner worked on "Rick Random" for the next five years.

1960s
As the vogue for pulp science fiction dwindled, Turner found work doing cover illustrations again for numerous publications, such as the popular science journal Practical Mechanics. By the mid-1960s, Turner had mostly abandoned the world of monthly publishing, and was producing original paint-by-number paintings for the company Craftmaster.

In 1965, Turner was offered the opportunity to draw his first colour comic strip, based on the Gerry Anderson TV series Stingray, for TV Century 21 Stingray Extra (a holiday special issue of the weekly comic TV Century 21). The following year, Turner began contributing to TV Century 21 on a regular basis with his first continuing colour comic strip, "The Daleks", featuring the mechanical villains from the TV series Doctor Who. Turner replaced the strip's previous artist Richard Jennings, initially for issues 50 and 51 (January 1966) and then on a regular basis from issue 59 (March 1966). He continued to illustrate The Daleks until its conclusion in issue 104 (January 1967).

Between 1965 and 1969, Turner also contributed strips based on the various Anderson series to a number of TV Century 21 holiday specials and the publisher's hardback annual books, illustrating further Stingray strips in addition to ones based on Fireball XL5, Thunderbirds, Captain Scarlet and the Mysterons and Joe 90. He illustrated all 80 pages of the Joe 90 Puzzle Book and the same number for the Joe 90 Dot to Dot Book (both Century 21 Publishing, 1968) as well as providing strips based on the series The Champions, Star Trek and Land of the Giants for the Joe 90 Top Secret Annual (1969). In addition, he again found work with Amalgamated Press (now called Fleetway), taking over the black-and-white "Robot Builders" strip from Carlos Cruz for Fleetway's Tiger and Hurricane comic magazine.

1970s
In the 1970s, Turner began working for IPC Media (which had absorbed Fleetway), drawing strips for the Whizzer and Chips comic, such as "Wonder-car", "Archie's Angels" and "Danny Drew's Dialling Man", which were generally aimed at the young adult market. As well as contributing a regular Star Trek strip to IPC Media's TV21, he also continued his association with Gerry Anderson with Thunderbirds strips for the 1972 Thunderbirds Annual and the 1973 Countdown Annual.

In the late 1970s, Turner drew a number of "Judge Dredd" comic strips for 2000 A.D., including several episodes in the first multi-part story The Robot Wars although his style did not gain the favour of his editors, and the long-term assignment eventually fell to other artists. Instead, Turner found regular work on the re-launched version of IPC's formerly violent comic Action with "The Spinball Slaves"—a sequel to the science-fiction sport strip "Death Game 1999" (influenced by the 1975 film Rollerball) and its less violent sequel "Spinball". When Action merged with IPC's war comic Battle Picture Weekly to become Battle Action, Turner contributed a further "Spinball" sequel strip entitled "The Spinball Wars". He also worked on a revival of "Rick Random" also for 2000 A.D..

1980s
Turner continued to work for Battle Action under its new title Battle Action Force, drawing many of the "Action Force" strips, which featured Action Man characters licensed from Mattel. He also began drawing a strip called "Journey to the Stars" for the new IPC Media weekly comic Speed, although publication ceased shortly afterwards. Turner found work with other IPC comics such as War and Battle Picture Library, but the shrinking comics market in 1980s Britain soon caused these publications to fold in 1984. At this time, Turner announced his retirement, although not long afterwards he was found drawing strips for an independent small press, including "Nick Hazard" and "Kalgan the Golden".

1990s and death
By this point, Turner had started regularly providing book cover illustrations once again, on this occasion for Gryphon Books. He also painted a new six-part "Daleks" strip for  Doctor Who Magazine.

Turner died of a stroke and a heart attack in 1998. His artwork has continued to appear posthumously on books published by Gryphon Books and Wildside Press, drawing on many previously unpublished pieces as well as re-printing his earlier book cover illustrations.

Bibliography

Books
The following books are entirely or substantially illustrated by Turner:

 Into Space with Ace Brave! Space-Master (Birn Brothers Ltd., 1953) (pop-up book)
 Joe 90 Puzzle Book (Century 21 Publishing, 1968) (written, devised and illustrated by Turner)
 Joe 90 Dot to Dot Book (Century 21 Publishing, 1968) (written, devised and illustrated by Turner)
 Rick Random: Space Detective (656 pages, Prion Books, 2008) (all bar one story illustrated by Turner)

Comic strips
Comics work includes:

The Amstor Computer
 "854391 – A Modern Christmas..." (wr: Roy Preston, in Eagle #92, 1983)
Captain Scarlet and the Mysterons
 "Assassination of the Director of Economic Affairs" (in Captain Scarlet Annual, September 1967)
 Untitled Story (in TV Century 21 Annual, September 1968)
 "Target London" (in Captain Scarlet Annual, September 1968)
 "Destroy San Francisco" (in TV21 Annual, September 1969)
 "Lost in Time" (in TV21 Annual, September 1969)
The Champions
 "Error of Judgement" (in Joe 90 Top Secret Annual, September 1969)
The Daleks
 "The Eve of the War", parts 4 and 5 (wr: David Whitaker, in TV Century 21 #50–51, January 1966)
 "The Rogue Planet" (wr: David Whitaker, in TV Century 21 #59–62, March 1966)
 "Impasse" (wr: David Whitaker, in TV Century 21 #63–69, April–May 1966)
 "The Terrorkon Harvest" (wr: David Whitaker, in TV Century 21 #70–75, May–June 1966)
 "Legacy of Yesteryear" (wr: David Whitaker, in TV Century 21 #76–85, July–September 1966)
 "Shadow of Humanity" (wr: David Whitaker, in TV Century 21 #86–89, September 1966)
 "The Emissaries of Jevo" (wr: David Whitaker, in TV Century 21 #90–95, October–November 1966)
 "Road to Conflict" (wr: David Whitaker, in TV Century 21 #96–104, November 1966 – January 1967)
 "Return of the Elders" (wr: John Lawrence, in Doctor Who Magazine #249–254, February–July 1997)
Fireball XL5
 "The Drifting Coffin" (in Fireball XL5 Annual , September 1966)
Joe 90
 "Deadly Toy" (in Joe 90 Annual, September 1968)
 "Rat Trap" (in Joe 90 Annual, September 1968)
 "Ambush" (in Joe 90 Annual, September 1968)
 "Doctor Fawkes" (in Joe 90 Annual, September 1968)
 "Check Mate" (in Joe 90 Annual, September 1968)
 "Break-Down" (in Joe 90 Annual, September 1969)
 "The Deadly Swarm" (in Joe 90 Annual, September 1969)
Judge Dredd
 "Robots" (wr: John Wagner, in 2000 A.D. #9, April 1977)
 "Robot Wars", parts 2, 4 and 7 (wr: John Wagner, in 2000 A.D. #11, 13 and 16, May–June 1977)
 "The Solar Sniper" (wr: Gerry Finley-Day, in 2000 A.D. #21, July 1977)
Land of the Giants
 Untitled Story (in Joe 90 Top Secret Annual, September 1969)
Rick Random
 "Kidnappers from Space" (in Super-Detective Library #44, December 1954)
 "The Case of the Man Who Owned the Moon" (in Super-Detective Library #49, March 1955)
 "The Five Lives of Mr. Quex" (in Super-Detective Library #64, September 1955)
 "The Gold Rush Planet" (in Super-Detective Library #66, October 1955)
 "The Mystery of the Moving Planet" (in Super-Detective Library #70, December 1955)
 "The Planet of Lost Men" (in Super-Detective Library #79, June 1956)
 "Invaders from the Ocean Planet" (in Super-Detective Library #83, July 1956)
 "Manhunt Through Space" (in Super-Detective Library #90, October 1956)
 "The Mystery of the Time Travellers" (in Super-Detective Library #97, February 1957)
 "The Riddle of the Vanishing People" (in Super-Detective Library #101, April 1957)
 "Sabotage from Space" (in Super-Detective Library #111, September 1957)
 "The S.O.S. from Space" (wr: Harry Harrison, in Super-Detective Library #115, November 1957)
 "The Planet of Terror" (wr: Bob Kesten, in Super-Detective Library  #123, March 1958)
 "The Space Pirates" (wr: Harry Harrison, in Super-Detective Library  #127, May 1958)
 "Perilous Mission" (wr: Harry Harrison, in Super-Detective Library  #129, June 1958)
 "The Mystery of the Frozen World" (wr: Bob Kesten, Super-Detective Library  #133, August 1958)
 "The Mystery of the Robot World" (wr: Conrad Frost and Barry Coker, in Super-Detective Library  #137, October 1958)
 "The Terror from Space" (wr: Harry Harrison, in Super-Detective Library  #143, January 1959)
 "The Threat from Space" (wr: Bob Kesten, in Super-Detective Library  #153, June 1959)
 "The Kidnapped Planet" (wr: Bob Kesten, in Super-Detective Library  #163, December 1959)
 "The Riddle of the Astral Assassin!" (wr: Steve Moore, in 2000 A.D. and Star Lord #113–117, May–June 1979)
Star Trek
 Untitled Story (in Joe 90 Top Secret Annual, September 1969)
 Untitled Story (in TV21 #58–61, October 1970)
'Stingray'
 "Double Trap" (in TV Century 21 Stingray Extra, May 1965)
 Untitled Story (in TV Century 21 International Extra, October 1965)
 "The Collector" (in Stingray Annual, September 1966)
 "The Sunken City" (in Stingray Annual, September 1966)
 "Death Ray" (in Stingray Annual, September 1966)
Tharg's Future Shocks
 "Just Like Home" (wr: Peter Harris, in 2000 A.D. #29, September 1977)
 "Beautiful World" (in 2000 A.D. #30, September 1977)
'Thunderbirds'
 Untitled Story (in Thunderbirds Extra, March 1966)
 "The Hood Makes a Strike" (in Thunderbirds Annual, September 1966)
 Untitled Story (in Thunderbirds TV Century 21 Spring Extra, March 1967)
 "Volcano Alert" (in TV Century 21 Annual, September 1967)
 "Bridge of Fear" (in Thunderbirds Annual, September 1967)
 "Day Return from Death" (in Thunderbirds Annual, September 1968)
 "Curse of the Elastos" (in Thunderbirds Annual, September 1968)
 "Fire Lords" (in Captain Scarlet and Thunderbirds Annual, September 1969)
 "Crash Down" (in Captain Scarlet and Thunderbirds Annual, September 1969)
 "Invisible Invader" (in Thunderbirds Annual 1972, September 1971)
 "The Law Breakers" (in Thunderbirds Annual 1972, September 1971)
 "The Collector" (in Countdown Annual 1973, September 1972)
Zero-X
 "Conflict on Mars" (in TV Century 21 Annual, September 1967)
 "Brink of Disaster" (in TV Century 21 Annual, September 1968)
 "Break Out" (in TV21 Annual, September 1969)

Cover art (books)
The following books all feature cover illustrations by Turner:

Operation Venus  by John Russell Fearn (Scion, 1950)
Annihilation!  by Vargo Statten (John Russell Fearn) (Scion, 1950)
The Micro Men  by Vargo Statten (John Russell Fearn) (Scion, 1950)
Wanderer of Space  by Vargo Statten (John Russell Fearn) (Scion, 1950)
2,000 Years On!  by Vargo Statten (John Russell Fearn) (Scion, 1950)
Inferno!  by Vargo Statten (John Russell Fearn) (Scion, 1950)
The Cosmic Flame  by Vargo Statten (John Russell Fearn) (Scion, 1950)
Nebula X  by Vargo Statten (John Russell Fearn) (Scion, 1950)
The Sun Makers  by Vargo Statten (John Russell Fearn) (Scion, 1950)
The Avenging Martian  by Vargo Statten (John Russell Fearn) (Scion, 1951)
Deadline to Pluto  by Vargo Statten (John Russell Fearn) (Scion, 1951)
The Petrified Planet  by Vargo Statten (John Russell Fearn) (Scion, 1951)
The Devouring Fire  by Vargo Statten (John Russell Fearn) (Scion, 1951)
The Renegade Star  by Vargo Statten (John Russell Fearn) (Scion, 1951)
The New Satellite  by Vargo Statten (John Russell Fearn) (Scion, 1951)
The Catalyst  by Vargo Statten (John Russell Fearn) (Scion, 1951)
Anjani the Mighty  by Earl Titan (John Russell Fearn) (Scion, 1951)
The Gold of Akada  by Earl Titan (John Russell Fearn) (Scion, 1951)
The Caves of Death  by Victor Norwood (Scion, 1951)
The Skull of Kanaima  by Victor Norwood (Scion, 1951)
The Temple of the Dead  by Victor Norwood (Scion, 1951)
Spawn of Space  by Franz Harkon (Scion, 1951)
Destination Mars  by George Sheldon Brown (Dennis Hughes) (Edwin Self, 1951)
The Inner Cosmos  by Vargo Statten (John Russell Fearn) (Scion, 1952)
The Space Warp  by Vargo Statten (John Russell Fearn) (Scion, 1952)
The Eclipse Express  by Vargo Statten (John Russell Fearn) (Scion, 1952)
The Time Bridge  by Vargo Statten (John Russell Fearn) (Scion, 1952)
The Man from Tomorrow  by Vargo Statten (John Russell Fearn) (Scion, 1952)
The G-Bomb  by Vargo Statten (John Russell Fearn) (Scion, 1952)
Laughter in Space  by Vargo Statten (John Russell Fearn) (Scion, 1952)
Tremor  by Frank Lederman (Kaye Publications, 1952)
Two Days of Terror  by Roy Sheldon (H.J. Campbell) (Panther, 1952)
Ultra Spectrum  by Vargo Statten (John Russell Fearn) (Scion, 1953)
Zero Hour  by Vargo Statten (John Russell Fearn) (Scion, 1953)
The Black Avengers  by Vargo Statten (John Russell Fearn) (Scion, 1953)
Odyssey of Nine  by Vargo Statten (John Russell Fearn) (Scion, 1953)
Pioneer, 1990  by Vargo Statten (John Russell Fearn) (Scion, 1953)
Man of Two Worlds  by Vargo Statten (John Russell Fearn) (Scion, 1953)
The Lie Destroyer  by Vargo Statten (John Russell Fearn) (Scion, 1953)
Black Bargain  by Vargo Statten (John Russell Fearn) (Scion, 1953)
Moons for Sale  by Volsted Gridban (John Russell Fearn) (Scion, 1953)
The Dyno-Depressant  by Volsted Gridban (John Russell Fearn) (Scion, 1953)
Magnetic Brain  by Volsted Gridban (John Russell Fearn) (Scion, 1953)
Scourge of the Atom  by Volsted Gridban (John Russell Fearn) (Scion, 1953)
Exit Life  by Volsted Gridban (John Russell Fearn) (Scion, 1953)
The Master Must Die  by Volsted Gridban (John Russell Fearn) (Scion, 1953)
Conquerors of Venus  by Edgar Rees Kennedy (John W. Jennison) (Edwin Self, 1953)
Cosmic Exodus  by Conrad G. Holt (John Russell Fearn) (Tit-Bits Science-Fiction Library, 1953)
The Hell Fruit  by Lawrence F. Rose (John Russell Fearn) (Tit-Bits Science-Fiction Library, 1953)
Doomed Nation of the Skies  by Steve Future (Steve Gilroy) (Tit-Bits Science-Fiction Library, 1953)
The Star Seekers  by Francis G. Rayer (Tit-Bits Science-Fiction Library, 1953)
Sinister Forces  by Alvin Westwood (Brown Watson Ltd.,1953)
Planetoid Disposals Ltd.  by Volsted Gridban (E.C. Tubb) (Milestone, 1953)
Fugitive of Time  by Volsted Gridban (E.C. Tubb) (Milestone, 1953)
The Wall  by Charles Grey (E.C. Tubb) (Milestone, 1953)
Dynasty of Doom  by Charles Grey (E.C. Tubb) (Milestone, 1953)
Tormented City  by Charles Grey (E.C. Tubb) (Milestone, 1953)
Space Hunger  by Charles Grey (E.C. Tubb) (Milestone, 1953)
I Fight for Mars  by Charles Grey (E.C. Tubb) (Milestone, 1953)
The Great Ones  by Jon J. Deegan (Robert Sharp) (Panther, 1953)
Vanguard to Neptune  by J.M. Walsh (Cherry Tree Fantasy Books, 1953)
Zhorani (Master of the Universe)  by Karl Maras (H.K. Bulmer) (Comyns, 1953)
The Grand Illusion  by Vargo Statten (John Russell Fearn) (Scion, 1954)
Wealth of the Void  by Vargo Statten (John Russell Fearn) (Scion, 1954)
A Time Appointed  by Vargo Statten (John Russell Fearn) (Scion, 1954)
I Spy  by Vargo Statten (John Russell Fearn) (Scion, 1954)
1,000 Year Voyage  by Vargo Statten (John Russell Fearn) (Scion, 1954)
The Purple Wizard  by Volsted Gridban (John Russell Fearn) (Scion, 1954)
Frozen Limit  by Volsted Gridban (John Russell Fearn) (Scion, 1954)
I Came – I Saw – I Wondered  by Volsted Gridban (John Russell Fearn) (Scion, 1954)
The Genial Dinosaur  by Volsted Gridban (John Russell Fearn) (Scion, 1954)
The Lonely Astronomer  by Volsted Gridban (John Russell Fearn) (Scion, 1954)
The Plant from Infinity  by Karl Maras (Peter Hawkins) (Paladin Press, 1954)
Alien Life  by E.C. Tubb (Paladin Press, 1954)
The Living World  by Carl Maddox (E.C. Tubb) (Scion, 1954)
The Extra Man  by Charles Grey (E.C. Tubb) (Milestone, 1954)
Menace from the Past  by Carl Maddox (E.C. Tubb) (Scion, 1954)
City of No Return  by E.C. Tubb (Scion, 1954)
Hell Planet  by E.C. Tubb (Scion, 1954) [cover art reused from City of No Return (1954)]
The Resurrected Man  by E.C. Tubb (Scion, 1954)
The Hand of Havoc  by Charles Grey (E.C. Tubb) (Merit Books, 1954)
Enterprise 2115  by Charles Grey (E.C. Tubb) (Merit Books, 1954)
Before the Beginning  by Marx Reisen (Tit-Bits Science-Fiction Library, 1954)
Home is the Martian  by Philip Kent (H.K. Bulmer) (Tit-Bits Science-Fiction Library, 1954)
Mission to the Stars  by Philip Kent (H.K. Bulmer) (Tit-Bits Science-Fiction Library, 1954)
Slaves of the Spectrum  by Philip Kent (H.K. Bulmer) (Tit-Bits Science-Fiction Library, 1954)
Vassals of Venus  by Philip Kent (H.K. Bulmer) (Tit-Bits Science-Fiction Library, 1954)
The Dissentizens  by Bruno G. Condray (Leslie Humphreys) (Tit-Bits Science-Fiction Library, 1954)
Jupiter Equilateral  by John Rackham (John T. Phillifent) (Tit-Bits Science-Fiction Library, 1954)
The Master Weed  by John Rackham (John T. Phillifent) (Tit-Bits Science-Fiction Library, 1954)
Space Puppet  by John Rackham (John T. Phillifent) (Tit-Bits Science-Fiction Library, 1954)
Slave Traders of the Sky  by Steve Future (Steve Gilroy) (Tit-Bits Science-Fiction Library, 1953)
Voyage into Space  by Earl Van Loden (Lisle Willis) (Edwin Self, 1954)
The Yellow Planet  by George Sheldon Brown (John W. Jennison) (Edwin Self, 1954)
Alien Virus  by John Rackham (John T. Phillifent) (Tit-Bits Science-Fiction Library, 1955)
Dimension of Illion  by Irving Heine (Dennis Hughes) (Tit-Bits Science-Fiction Library, 1955)
Exile from Jupiter  by Bruno G. Condray (Leslie Humphreys) (Tit-Bits Science-Fiction Library, 1955)
Deep Freeze  by Jonathan Burke (Panther, 1955)
One Against Time  by Hank Janson (Stephen Frances) (Moring, 1956) [background art only]
The Unseen Assassin  by Hank Janson (Stephen Frances) (Moring, 1956) [background art only]
A Mirror of Witchcraft  by Christina Hole (Pedigree Books, 1957)
The Satanic Mass  by H.T.F. Rhodes (Pedigree Books, 1957)
Pandora’s Box  by E.C. Tubb (Gryphon Books, 1996)
The Golden Amazon  by John Russell Fearn (Gryphon Books, 1996)
Temple of Death  by E.C. Tubb (Gryphon Books, 1996)
Saturn Patrol  by E.C. Tubb (Gryphon Books, 1996)
Kalgan the Golden  by E.C. Tubb (Gryphon Books, 1996)
Assignment New York  by E.C. Tubb (Gryphon Books, 1996)
Aftermath  by John Russell Fearn (Gryphon Books, 1996)
The Golden Amazon Returns  by John Russell Fearn (Gryphon Books, 1996)
The Golden Amazon's Triumph  by John Russell Fearn (Gryphon Books, 1996)
Get Me Headquarters  by Stephen Frances (Gryphon Books, 1996)
Hell Hath No Fury  by Sydney J. Bounds (Gryphon Books, 1996)
She Wanted a Guy  by Norman Lazenby (Gryphon Books, 1996)
You Take the Rap  by John Russell Fearn (Gryphon Books, 1996)
Fantasy Annual 1, ed. Philip Harbottle and Sean Wallace (Cosmos Books, 1997)
The Return  by E.C. Tubb (Gryphon Books, 1997)
Murder in Space  by E.C. Tubb (Gryphon Books, 1997)
The Golden Amazon's Diamond Quest  by John Russell Fearn (Gryphon Books, 1997)
Murder Wears a Halo  by Howard Browne (Gryphon Books, 1997)
Kidnapped!  by Maurice Hershman (Gryphon Books, 1997)
Kill and Desire  by Stephen Frances (Gryphon Books, 1997)
Mitzi  by Michael Avallone (Gryphon Books, 1997)
I Fight for Mars  by E.C. Tubb (Gryphon Books, 1998)
Alien Life  by E.C. Tubb (Gryphon Books, 1998)
The Tall Adventurer: The Works of E.C. Tubb  by Sean Wallace and Philip Harbottle (Beccon, 1998)
The Gold of Akada  by John Russell Fearn (Gryphon Books, 1998)
The Amazon Strikes Again  by John Russell Fearn (Gryphon Books, 1998)
The Fortress of Utopia  by Jack Williamson (Gryphon Books, 1998)
Twin of the Amazon  by John Russell Fearn (Gryphon Books, 1998)
Conquest of the Amazon  by John Russell Fearn (Gryphon Books, 1998)
Anjani the Mighty  by John Russell Fearn (Gryphon Books, 1998)
If You Have Tears  by Howard Browne (Gryphon Books, 1998)
The Whispering Gorilla  by Don Wilcox (Gryphon Books, 1998)
Fantasy Annual 2, ed. Philip Harbottle and Sean Wallace (Cosmos Books, 1998)
Earth Set Free  by E.C. Tubb (Gryphon Books, 1999)
The Wall  by E.C. Tubb (Gryphon Books, 1999)
The Stellar Legion  by E.C. Tubb (Gryphon Books, 1999)
The Ruler of Fate & Xandulu  by Jack Williamson (Gryphon Books, 1999)
The Slitherers  by John Russell Fearn (Gryphon Books, 1999)
The Iron God / Tomorrow  by Jack Williamson / E.C. Tubb (Gryphon Books, 1999)
Lord of Atlantis  by John Russell Fearn (Gryphon Books, 1999)
Triangle of Power  by John Russell Fearn (Gryphon Books, 1999)
The Stone from the Green Star  by Jack Williamson (Gryphon Books, 1999)
Gryphon SF and Fantasy Reader 1, ed. Philip Harbottle (Gryphon Books, 1999)
Fantasy Annual 3, ed. Philip Harbottle and Sean Wallace (Cosmos Books, 1999)
Death God’s Doom  by E.C. Tubb (Cosmos Books, 1999)
The Sleeping City  by E.C. Tubb (Cosmos Books, 1999) [cover art reused from A Mirror of Witchcraft (1957)]
Manton's World  by John Russell Fearn (Cosmos Books, 1999)
Alien Worlds  by E.C. Tubb (Pulp Publishing, 1999)
The Amythyst City  by John Russell Fearn (Gryphon Books, 2000)
Daughter of the Golden Amazon  by John Russell Fearn (Gryphon Books, 2000)
Blue Spot & Entropy Reversed  by Jack Williamson (Gryphon Books, 2000)
Invader on My Back  by Philip E. High (Cosmos Books, 2000)
These Savage Futurians  by Philip E. High (Cosmos Books, 2000)
The Extra Man   by E.C. Tubb (Wildside Press, 2000) [cover art reused from The Plant from Infinity (1954)]
Fantasy Annual 4, ed. Philip Harbottle and Sean Wallace (Wildside Press, 2000)
The Central Intelligence  by John Russell Fearn (Gryphon Books, 2001)
Fantasy Quarterly 1, ed. Philip Harbottle (Wildside Press, 2001)
The Best of John Russell Fearn, Vol. 1  by John Russell Fearn (Wildside Press, 2001)
The Best of John Russell Fearn, Vol. 2  by John Russell Fearn (Wildside Press, 2001)
The Cosmic Crusaders  by John Russell Fearn (Gryphon Books, 2002)
Parasite Planet  by John Russell Fearn (Gryphon Books, 2002)
The Genial Dinosaur  by John Russell Fearn (Gryphon Books, 2002)
A Thing of the Past  by John Russell Fearn (Gryphon Books, 2002)
The Space-Born  by E.C. Tubb (Wildside Press, 2002) [cover art reused from 1,000 Year Voyage (1954)]
The Best of Philip E. High  by Philip E. High (Wildside Press, 2002)
Fantasy Adventures 1, ed. Philip Harbottle (Wildside Press, 2002)
World Out of Step  by John Russell Fearn (Gryphon Books, 2003)
The Shadow People  by John Russell Fearn (Gryphon Books, 2003)
Fantasy Adventures 2, ed. Philip Harbottle (Wildside Press, 2003)
Fantasy Adventures 3, ed. Philip Harbottle (Wildside Press, 2003)
Fantasy Adventures 4, ed. Philip Harbottle (Wildside Press, 2003)
The Best of Sydney J. Bounds  by Sydney J. Bounds (Wildside Press, 2003)
The Best of Sydney J. Bounds, Vol. 2  by Sydney J. Bounds (Wildside Press, 2003)
Stardeath  by E.C. Tubb (Wildside Press, 2003) [cover art reused from Dynasty of Doom (1953)]
Liquid Death and Other Stories  by John Russell Fearn (Wildside Press, 2003)
Voice of the Conqueror  by John Russell Fearn (Wildside Press, 2003)
The Intelligence Gigantic  by John Russell Fearn (Wildside Press, 2003)
Liners of Time  by John Russell Fearn (Wildside Press, 2003)
The Butterfly Planet  by Philip E. High (Wildside Press, 2003)
Fantasy Annual 5, ed. Philip Harbottle and Sean Wallace (Cosmos Books, 2003)
Dark Centauri  by John Glasby (Gryphon Books, 2004)
Dwellers in Darkness  by John Russell Fearn (Gryphon Books, 2004)
Kingpin Planet  by John Russell Fearn (Gryphon Books, 2004)
World in Reverse  by John Russell Fearn (Gryphon Books, 2004)
A Step to the Stars  by Philip E. High (Cosmos Books, 2004)
Fantasy Adventures 5, ed. Philip Harbottle (Wildside Press, 2005)
Fantasy Adventures 6, ed. Philip Harbottle (Wildside Press, 2005)
Fantasy Adventures 7, ed. Philip Harbottle (Wildside Press, 2005)
Fantasy Adventures 8, ed. Philip Harbottle (Wildside Press, 2005)
Fantasy Adventures 11, ed. Philip Harbottle (Wildside Press, 2006)
Fantasy Adventures 13, ed. Philip Harbottle (Wildside Press, 2008)

Cover art (magazines)
The following magazines all feature cover illustrations by Turner:

Tales of Tomorrow, #3, 4 (John Spencer and Co. 1951, 1952)
Futuristic Science Stories, #7 (John Spencer and Co. 1952)
Wonders of the Spaceways, #3 (John Spencer and Co. 1952)
Worlds of Fantasy, #7 (John Spencer and Co. 1952)
Out of this World, #2 (John Spencer and Co. 1954)
Vargo Statten Science Fiction Magazine, #1, ed. Vargo Statten (John Russell Fearn) (Scion, 1954)
Vargo Statten British Science Fiction Magazine, #5, ed. Vargo Statten (John Russell Fearn) (Scion, 1954)
Planet X-1: The New World (Tit-Bits Science-Fiction Comics, 1954)
Captain Diamond and the Space Pirates (Tit-Bits Science-Fiction Comics, 1954)
The Scourge of the Carbon Belt (Tit-Bits Science-Fiction Comics, 1954)
The Terror of Titan (Tit-Bits Science-Fiction Comics, 1954)
Practical Mechanics, March 1954 (George Newnes, Ltd, 1954)
British Science Fiction Magazine, #10–19, ed. Vargo Statten (John Russell Fearn) (Dragon, 1955)
Supernatural Stories, #6 (Badger, 1955)
Super Detective Library, #53: The Case of the Space Bubble (Amalgamated Press, 1955)
Practical Mechanics, September 1955 (George Newnes, Ltd, 1955)
Practical Mechanics, November 1955 (George Newnes, Ltd, 1955)
Practical Mechanics, April 1957 (George Newnes, Ltd, 1957)
Practical Mechanics, December 1957 (George Newnes, Ltd, 1957)
Practical Mechanics, April 1958 (George Newnes, Ltd, 1958)
Super Detective Library, #153: Rick Random and the Threat from Space (Amalgamated Press, 1959)
Practical Mechanics, April–July 1961 (George Newnes, Ltd, 1961)
Practical Mechanics, September 1961 – August 1962 (George Newnes, Ltd, 1961/62)
The Dalek Chronicles (Marvel Comics UK, 1994)

References

Other sources

Ron Turner at 2000 AD online
Ron Turner at British Comics Art
Ron Turner at Lambiek's Comiclopedia

External links

Ron Turner cover collection at Flickr.com

 

1922 births
1998 deaths
20th-century British artists
20th-century British writers
British comic strip cartoonists
British comics artists
British comics writers
British Army personnel of World War II
Fleetway and IPC Comics creators
Place of death missing
British speculative fiction artists